Melvin Eugene Tuten, Jr. (born November 11, 1971) is a former American football offensive lineman and coach. He was most recently the offensive line coach for the Marion Blue Racers of the Continental Indoor Football League. He is also a former American football offensive tackle in the National Football League, and Continental Indoor Football League.

Early life
He attended Woodrow Wilson High School in Washington D.C. where he lettered in football and basketball.

College career
He played college football at Syracuse where he was a tight end and lettered 3 times.
During his senior year, he played for the 1994-1995 Syracuse Basketball team, playing in 4 games as a forward. He scored a total of 7 points and had 1 rebound.

Professional career

Cincinnati Bengals
He was drafted by the Cincinnati Bengals in the third round of the 1995 NFL Draft. During his rookie season, he did see some action at tight end, where he caught 2 passes for 12 yards and 1 touchdown.
Games Played 32 Starts 9

Denver Broncos
In 1999, he signed with the Denver Broncos after 2 years off.
He was released
Games Played 2 Starts 0

Carolina Panthers
In 2000, he signed with the Carolina Panthers. He recovered the only fumble of his career while starting at right tackle in 2002.
He was placed on the IR in 2003 with a knee injury, effectively ending his NFL career.
Games Played 32 Starts 8

Marion Blue Racers
After several injuries, and lack of talented linemen, Tuten suited up for the final 4 games for the Blue Racers, who play in the Continental Indoor Football League. He started both of the team's playoff games.,
who finished the regular season 8-2 and lost the CIFL Championship Game to the Cincinnati Commandosa

Coaching career
He has helped out at Midwest Lineman Camp at Illinois Wesleyan

Marion Blue Racers
He was named the lineman coach for the Marion Blue Racers for the 2011 season, and will return again in 2012

References

1971 births
Living people
American football offensive tackles
Syracuse Orange football players
Cincinnati Bengals players
Denver Broncos players
Carolina Panthers players
Marion Blue Racers players
Woodrow Wilson High School (Washington, D.C.) alumni